The 2016 Nigeria Professional Football League (referred to as the Nigerian Glo premier league for sponsorship reasons) is the 45th season of the Nigeria Premier League, the top Nigerian professional league for association football clubs, since its establishment in 1972, and the 26th since the rebranding of the league as the "Professional League".

Enugu Rangers won their seventh league title and first since 1984. Giwa, Heartland, Ikorodu United and Warri Wolves finished as the bottom four teams in the standings and will be relegated to Nigeria National League for the 2017 season.

Clubs
A total of 20 teams will contest the league including 16 teams from the previous season and four teams promoted from the Nigeria National League. The four promoted teams replace Bayelsa United, Kwara United, Sharks and Taraba who were all relegated to the National League at the end of the previous season

League table

Positions by round

References

Nigeria Professional Football League seasons
2015–16 in African association football leagues
2015–16 in Nigerian football